In trampolining a kip is a skill mostly used by coaches while helping performers develop new skills.
In such circumstances an experienced coach will either stand, or bounce, alongside the performer and by timing their actions in the bed they will be able to either increase, decrease, or simply stabilize the level of bounce experienced by the performer.

The Kip action itself occurs while the coach is in contact with the trampoline bed; they will bend their knees and then depress the bed downwards either:
 in time with the performers landing in order to create a higher rebound; or
 shortly before the performers landing in order to 'kill' the bed slightly thereby reducing the height of the performers rebound.

Other uses
Although strongly discouraged in competitive trampoline clubs for safety reasons, the kipping action is used in a number of games played on trampolines such as crack the egg.

References

Trampolining